Mark Rosewater (born May 25, 1967) is the  head designer for Magic: The Gathering, a position he has held since 2003.

Biography
Rosewater grew up in Pepper Pike, Ohio. In his youth, he worked as a professional magician. Rosewater has described his young self as a "social outcast" whose intelligence and small size led to bullying, and he never naturally lost his baby teeth, which had to be surgically removed. Despite these difficulties, he became a successful high school student at Orange High School with numerous scholarship offers. He attended Boston University, where he earned a Bachelor of Science in Communication.

Career

Television

After graduating, Rosewater started his career in television as a runner. He then found work as a writer. Before 1994 he was on the writing staff of Roseanne. He is credited for two Roseanne episodes: "Vegas, Vegas" and "Take My Bike, Please", both aired in 1991. He considered his time in Hollywood a "roller coaster ride."  While working as a freelance writer he took a job at a game store in order to have some social contacts. Working there he first found out about Magic: The Gathering from a customer.

Magic: The Gathering
Since 1995, Rosewater has worked for Wizards of the Coast, the company which makes Magic: The Gathering. He wrote puzzles based on Magic cards and other articles for The Duelist, the Wizards of the Coast magazine promoting and covering Magic. In 1996 Magic: The Puzzling was published, a collection of 25 puzzles written for The Duelist.  Since 1996 Rosewater has worked for Wizards of the Coast as a designer of Magic cards. Rosewater has designed at least one card for every Magic expansion since Alliances. While working for Wizards of the Coast, he wrote columns called “Insider Trading” for the magazines The Duelist, Topdeck, and The Sideboard which gave an inside look at Magic design.

Rosewater has been the lead designer for Tempest, Urza’s Destiny, Odyssey, Mirrodin, Fifth Dawn, Ravnica: City of Guilds, Future Sight, Shadowmoor, Eventide, Zendikar, Scars of Mirrodin, Innistrad, Dark Ascension, Gatecrash, Dragon's Maze, Theros, Khans of Tarkir, Battle for Zendikar, Kaladesh, Amonkhet, Ixalan, Unstable, Dominaria, Guilds of Ravnica, Ravnica Allegiance, War of the Spark, Throne of Eldraine, Unsanctioned, Ikoria: Lair of Behemoths, and Zendikar Rising. He was also the sole designer of Unglued; in it he combined his career as a magic card designer with his previous career as a comedy writer. Picking up on the comic note of the "un"-sets, he judged the Unglued pre-release wearing a chicken suit and the Unhinged pre-release wearing a donkey suit. He also wrote flavor text in various sets including Mirage and Tempest.

Rosewater advocated for Pro Tournament (organized, competitive Magic play with significant cash prizes) for years, including the important idea of having feature matches at professional events.  Feature matches are chosen at Pro Tournaments to be highlighted for spectators and web coverage because the players or the decks involved are well known or thought to be of greater interest. He is notable for his quick ascent to the head of Magic the Gathering as well as his personable demeanor.

Since 2002, Rosewater has a weekly column called "Making Magic" on magicthegathering.com, the official site of Wizards of the Coast. In these columns, much like in his previous "Insider Trader"-columns he gives an inside look on how Magic cards are created. He has written on many controversial subjects, such as why Wizards of the Coast makes "bad rares".
Other key subjects of his columns include Wizards of the Coast's "psychographic" profiles of players called "Timmy/Tammy", "Johnny/Jenny", "Vorthos", and "Spike" and the color wheel. He often writes his articles in off-the-wall or unusual styles. For instance in one column he took the perspective of the Magic card "", in another he wrote from the perspective of the mechanic "splice". One article, which even had the subject "Mark Rosewater Admits He’s %#@$ Insane!" was written like a bulletin board on one of his columns. Many articles also touch upon his personal life. Rosewater claims he reads every email sent to him and has written several mailbag columns in which he responds to praise and criticism alike.

In December 2003 he became Magic's lead designer, later called head designer. Before that he was senior head designer. As head designer Rosewater has written a "State of Design" column every year. In it he reviews the Magic design of the previous year and given plans for future Magic designs. His most important contribution as a head designer is the institution of block design.

Rosewater's nickname is Maro.  This came about because the old email system of Wizards of the Coast had a feature that could complete names based on the letters typed, and Bill Rose realized that maro was the shortest unique combination of letters needed to compose a message.  In the Mirage expansion of the card game, a creature card named "" named after him was included; Rosewater claims that it is his favorite Magic card.  is his second favorite card. He made the art of this card himself, for which he was paid a $1.00 check, which he never cashed. He is also known for his podcast, Drive to Work, where he talks in depth about various disjointed subjects, mostly himself. Rosewater considers his personality to align with that ascribed to blue-red in the game itself, and the player profile of "Johnny".

Personal life
Rosewater is married to Lora Rosewater. They have three children: a daughter Rachel (born 2000) and twins Adam and Sarah (born 2004). As a hobby Rosewater likes "stereotypically geeky things", such as comics, television, games and writing. For instance he owns a collection of action figures of comic book characters.
He was once trapped inside Fred Astaire's estate.

References

External links
 All articles by Mark Rosewater on magic.wizards.com
 
 Blogatog, Mark Rosewater's blog on Tumblr

20th-century American Jews
Boston University College of Communication alumni
Magic: The Gathering
Living people
1967 births
American television writers
American male television writers
21st-century American Jews